"Let Yourself Go" is a popular song written by Irving Berlin for the 1936 film Follow the Fleet, where it was introduced by Ginger Rogers.

Background
Ginger Rogers performed the song in the 1936 musical Follow the Fleet backed up by Jeanne Gray, Betty Grable, and Joy Hodges. She reprised the song in an audition scene.

Notable recordings
Fred Astaire - recorded January 30, 1936 for Columbia Records (catalog No. 3116D).
Stacey KentLet Yourself Go: Celebrating Fred Astaire (2000)
Ella FitzgeraldElla Fitzgerald Sings the Irving Berlin Songbook (1958)
Kristin ChenowethLet Yourself Go (2003)
The Boswell Sisters (1936)
Tony BennettBennett/Berlin (1987)
Crossroads - That Lucky Old Sun (2011)
Alex Mendham & His Orchestra - On With The Show (2017)

References

External links

Songs written by Irving Berlin
1936 songs